Charles-Nicolas Peaucellier (16 June 1832 – 4 October 1919) was a French engineer who graduated from the École polytechnique. He made a career in the French army and was promoted to général de division in 1888.

He is best known for the Peaucellier–Lipkin linkage which was partly named after him.

References

French mechanical engineers
1832 births
1913 deaths
French generals